Tadao Nagatsuma from the Osaka University, Japan was named Fellow of the Institute of Electrical and Electronics Engineers (IEEE) in 2015 for contribution to millimeter and terahertzwave communications using photonics.

References

Fellow Members of the IEEE
Living people
Year of birth missing (living people)
Place of birth missing (living people)
Academic staff of Osaka University